Cyanodontia is a fungal genus in the family Meruliaceae. It is a monotypic genus, circumscribed by mycologist Kurt Hjorstam in 1987 to contain the single species Cyanodontia spathulata. This is a toothed crust fungus that is found in East Africa. The type was collected by Leif Ryvarden in Tanga, Tanzania in 1973.

References

Taxa described in 1987
Fungi of Africa
Meruliaceae
Monotypic Polyporales genera